The Planck constant, or Planck's constant, is a fundamental physical constant of foundational importance in quantum mechanics. The constant gives the relationship between the energy of a photon and its frequency, and by the mass-energy equivalence, the relationship between mass and frequency. Specifically, a photon's energy is equal to its frequency multiplied by the Planck constant.
 
In metrology it is used, together with other constants, to define the kilogram, the SI unit of mass. The SI units are defined in such a way that, when the Planck constant is expressed in SI units, it has the exact value 

The constant was first postulated by Max Planck in 1900 as part of a solution to the ultraviolet catastrophe. At the end of the 19th century, accurate measurements of the spectrum of black body radiation existed, but the distribution of those measurements at higher frequencies diverged significantly from what was predicted by then-existing theories. Planck empirically derived a formula for the observed spectrum. He assumed that a hypothetical electrically charged oscillator in a cavity that contained black-body radiation can only change its energy in quantized steps, and that the energies of those steps are proportional to the frequency of the oscillator's associated electromagnetic wave. He was able to calculate the proportionality constant from experimental measurements, and that constant is named in his honor. 

In 1905, Albert Einstein determined a "quantum" or minimal element of the energy of the electromagnetic wave itself. The light quantum behaved in some respects as an electrically neutral particle, and was eventually called a photon. Max Planck received the 1918 Nobel Prize in Physics "in recognition of the services he rendered to the advancement of Physics by his discovery of energy quanta".

Origin of the constant 

Planck's constant was formulated as part of Max Planck's successful effort to produce a mathematical expression that accurately predicted the observed spectral distribution of thermal radiation from a closed furnace (black-body radiation). This mathematical expression is now known as Planck's law.

In the last years of the 19th century, Max Planck was investigating the problem of black-body radiation first posed by Kirchhoff some 40 years earlier. Every physical body spontaneously and continuously emits electromagnetic radiation. There was no expression or explanation for the overall shape of the observed emission spectrum. At the time, Wien's law fit the data for short wavelengths and high temperatures, but failed for long wavelengths. Also around this time, but unknown to Planck, Lord Rayleigh had derived theoretically a formula, now known as the Rayleigh–Jeans law, that could reasonably predict long wavelengths but failed dramatically at short wavelengths.

Approaching this problem, Planck hypothesized that the equations of motion for light describe a set of harmonic oscillators, one for each possible frequency. He examined how the entropy of the oscillators varied with the temperature of the body, trying to match Wien's law, and was able to derive an approximate mathematical function for the black-body spectrum, which gave a simple empirical formula for long wavelengths.

Planck tried to find a mathematical expression that could reproduce Wien's law (for short wavelengths) and the empirical formula (for long wavelengths). This expression included a constant, which is thought to be for Hilfsgrösse (auxiliary variable), and subsequently became known as the Planck constant. The expression formulated by Planck showed that the spectral radiance of a body for frequency  at absolute temperature  is given by
 

The spectral radiance of a body, describes the amount of energy it emits at different radiation frequencies. It is the power emitted per unit area of the body, per unit solid angle of emission, per unit frequency. The spectral radiance can also be expressed per unit wavelength  instead of per unit frequency. In this case, it is given by

showing how radiated energy emitted at shorter wavelengths increases more rapidly with temperature than energy emitted at longer wavelengths.

Planck's law may also be expressed in other terms, such as the number of photons emitted at a certain wavelength, or the energy density in a volume of radiation.

Planck soon realized that his solution was not unique. There were several different solutions, each of which gave a different value for the entropy of the oscillators. To save his theory, Planck resorted to using the then-controversial theory of statistical mechanics, which he described as "an act of desperation … ." One of his new boundary conditions was

With this new condition, Planck had imposed the quantization of the energy of the oscillators, "a purely formal assumption … actually I did not think much about it ..." in his own words, but one that would revolutionize physics. Applying this new approach to Wien's displacement law showed that the "energy element" must be proportional to the frequency of the oscillator, the first version of what is now sometimes termed the "Planck–Einstein relation":

He also made the first determination of the Boltzmann constant  from the same data and theory.

Development and application 
The black-body problem was revisited in 1905, when Lord Rayleigh and James Jeans (on the one hand) and Albert Einstein (on the other hand) independently proved that classical electromagnetism could never account for the observed spectrum. These proofs are commonly known as the "ultraviolet catastrophe", a name coined by Paul Ehrenfest in 1911. They contributed greatly (along with Einstein's work on the photoelectric effect) in convincing physicists that Planck's postulate of quantized energy levels was more than a mere mathematical formalism. The first Solvay Conference in 1911 was devoted to "the theory of radiation and quanta".

Photoelectric effect 

The photoelectric effect is the emission of electrons (called "photoelectrons") from a surface when light is shone on it. It was first observed by Alexandre Edmond Becquerel in 1839, although credit is usually reserved for Heinrich Hertz, who published the first thorough investigation in 1887. Another particularly thorough investigation was published by Philipp Lenard (Lénárd Fülöp) in 1902. Einstein's 1905 paper discussing the effect in terms of light quanta would earn him the Nobel Prize in 1921, after his predictions had been confirmed by the experimental work of Robert Andrews Millikan. The Nobel committee awarded the prize for his work on the photo-electric effect, rather than relativity, both because of a bias against purely theoretical physics not grounded in discovery or experiment, and dissent amongst its members as to the actual proof that relativity was real.

Before Einstein's paper, electromagnetic radiation such as visible light was considered to behave as a wave: hence the use of the terms "frequency" and "wavelength" to characterize different types of radiation. The energy transferred by a wave in a given time is called its intensity. The light from a theatre spotlight is more intense than the light from a domestic lightbulb; that is to say that the spotlight gives out more energy per unit time and per unit space (and hence consumes more electricity) than the ordinary bulb, even though the color of the light might be very similar. Other waves, such as sound or the waves crashing against a seafront, also have their intensity. However, the energy account of the photoelectric effect didn't seem to agree with the wave description of light.

The "photoelectrons" emitted as a result of the photoelectric effect have a certain kinetic energy, which can be measured. This kinetic energy (for each photoelectron) is independent of the intensity of the light, but depends linearly on the frequency; and if the frequency is too low (corresponding to a photon energy that is less than the work function of the material), no photoelectrons are emitted at all, unless a plurality of photons, whose energetic sum is greater than the energy of the photoelectrons, acts virtually simultaneously (multiphoton effect). Assuming the frequency is high enough to cause the photoelectric effect, a rise in intensity of the light source causes more photoelectrons to be emitted with the same kinetic energy, rather than the same number of photoelectrons to be emitted with higher kinetic energy.

Einstein's explanation for these observations was that light itself is quantized; that the energy of light is not transferred continuously as in a classical wave, but only in small "packets" or quanta. The size of these "packets" of energy, which would later be named photons, was to be the same as Planck's "energy element", giving the modern version of the Planck–Einstein relation:

Einstein's postulate was later proven experimentally: the constant of proportionality between the frequency of incident light  and the kinetic energy of photoelectrons  was shown to be equal to the Planck constant .

Atomic structure 

It was John William Nicholson in 1912 who introduced h-bar into the theory of the atom which was the first quantum and nuclear atom and the first to quantize angular momentum as h/2.  Niels Bohr quoted him in his 1913 paper of the Bohr model of the atom. The influence of the work of Nicholson’s nuclear quantum atomic model on Bohr’s model has been written about by many historians.

Niels Bohr introduced the third quantized model of the atom in 1913, in an attempt to overcome a major shortcoming of Rutherford's classical model. The first quantized model of the atom was introduced in 1910 by Arthur Erich Haas and was discussed at the 1911 Solvay conference. In classical electrodynamics, a charge moving in a circle should radiate electromagnetic radiation. If that charge were to be an electron orbiting a nucleus, the radiation would cause it to lose energy and spiral down into the nucleus. Bohr solved this paradox with explicit reference to Planck's work: an electron in a Bohr atom could only have certain defined energies 
 
Once the electron reached the lowest energy level, it could not get any closer to the nucleus (lower energy). This approach also allowed Bohr to account for the Rydberg formula, an empirical description of the atomic spectrum of hydrogen, and to account for the value of the Rydberg constant  in terms of other fundamental constants.

Bohr also introduced the quantity , now known as the reduced Planck constant or Dirac constant, as the quantum of angular momentum. At first, Bohr thought that this was the angular momentum of each electron in an atom: this proved incorrect and, despite developments by Sommerfeld and others, an accurate description of the electron angular momentum proved beyond the Bohr model. The correct quantization rules for electrons – in which the energy reduces to the Bohr model equation in the case of the hydrogen atom – were given by Heisenberg's matrix mechanics in 1925 and the Schrödinger wave equation in 1926: the reduced Planck constant remains the fundamental quantum of angular momentum. In modern terms, if  is the total angular momentum of a system with rotational invariance, and  the angular momentum measured along any given direction, these quantities can only take on the values

Uncertainty principle 

The Planck constant also occurs in statements of Werner Heisenberg's uncertainty principle. Given numerous particles prepared in the same state, the uncertainty in their position, and the uncertainty in their momentum, obey
 
where the uncertainty is given as the standard deviation of the measured value from its expected value. There are several other such pairs of physically measurable conjugate variables which obey a similar rule. One example is time vs. energy. The inverse relationship between the uncertainty of the two conjugate variables forces a tradeoff in quantum experiments, as measuring one quantity more precisely results in the other quantity becoming imprecise.

In addition to some assumptions underlying the interpretation of certain values in the quantum mechanical formulation, one of the fundamental cornerstones to the entire theory lies in the commutator relationship between the position operator  and the momentum operator :

where  is the Kronecker delta.

Photon energy 

The Planck relation connects the particular photon energy  with its associated wave frequency :
 

This energy is extremely small in terms of ordinarily perceived everyday objects.

de Broglie wavelength 

In 1923, Louis de Broglie generalized the Planck–Einstein relation by postulating that the Planck constant represents the proportionality between the momentum and the quantum wavelength of not just the photon, but the quantum wavelength of any particle. This was confirmed by experiments soon afterward. This holds throughout the quantum theory, including electrodynamics.  The de Broglie wavelength  of the particle is given by
 
where  denotes the linear momentum of a particle, such as a photon, or any other elementary particle.

The energy of a photon with angular frequency  is given by
 
while its linear momentum relates to
 
where  is an angular wavenumber. 

These two relations are the temporal and spatial parts of the special relativistic expression using 4-vectors.

Statistical mechanics 
Eventually, following upon Planck's discovery, it was speculated that physical action could not take on an arbitrary value, but instead was restricted to integer multiples of a very small quantity, the "[elementary] quantum of action", now called the Planck constant. This was a significant conceptual part of the so-called "old quantum theory" developed by physicists including Bohr, Sommerfeld, and Ishiwara, in which particle trajectories exist but are hidden, but quantum laws constrain them based on their action. This view has been replaced by fully modern quantum theory, in which definite trajectories of motion do not even exist; rather, the particle is represented by a wavefunction spread out in space and in time. Thus there is no value of the action as classically defined. Related to this is the concept of energy quantization which existed in old quantum theory and also exists in altered form in modern quantum physics. Classical physics cannot explain either quantization of energy or the lack of classical particle motion.

In many cases, such as for monochromatic light or for atoms, quantization of energy also implies that only certain energy levels are allowed, and values in between are forbidden.

Reduced Planck constant 

Implicit in the dimensions of the Planck constant is the fact that the SI unit of frequency, the hertz, represents one cycle per second.  One cycle corresponds to  radians of phase angle.

In applications where it is natural to use the angular frequency (i.e. where the frequency is expressed in terms of radians per second instead of cycles per second or hertz) it is often useful to absorb a factor of  into the Planck constant. The resulting constant is called the reduced Planck constant or Dirac constant.

Value 
The Planck constant has dimensions of angular momentum. In SI units, the Planck constant is expressed with the unit joule per hertz (J⋅Hz) or joule-second (J⋅s). 

The above values have been adopted as fixed in the 2019 redefinition of the SI base units.

Understanding the 'fixing' of the value of h 

Since 2019, the numerical value of the Planck constant has been fixed, with a finite decimal representation. This implies that mass metrology aims to find the value of one kilogram, and the kilogram is compensating. Every experiment aiming to measure the kilogram (such as the Kibble balance and the X-ray crystal density method), will essentially refine the value of a kilogram.

In the future, the value of one kilogram must be refined to  times the mass of the International Prototype of the Kilogram (IPK).

Significance of the value 

The Planck constant is related to the quantization of light and matter. It can be seen as a subatomic-scale constant. In a unit system adapted to subatomic scales, the electronvolt is the appropriate unit of energy and the petahertz the appropriate unit of frequency. Atomic unit systems are based (in part) on the Planck constant. The physical meaning of the Planck constant could suggest some basic features of our physical world. 

The Planck constant is one of the smallest constants used in physics. This reflects the fact that on a scale adapted to humans, where energies are typical of the order of kilojoules and times are typical of the order of seconds or minutes, the Planck constant is very small. One can regard the Planck constant to be only relevant to the microscopic scale instead of the macroscopic scale in our everyday experience.

Equivalently, the order of the Planck constant reflects the fact that everyday objects and systems are made of a large number of microscopic particles. Each photon has an energy . That is a very small amount of energy in terms of everyday experience, but everyday experience is not concerned with individual photons any more than with individual atoms or molecules.

Determination 
In principle, the Planck constant can be determined by examining the spectrum of a black-body radiator or the kinetic energy of photoelectrons, and this is how its value was first calculated in the early twentieth century. In practice, these are no longer the most accurate methods.

Since the value of the Planck constant is fixed now, it is no longer determined or calculated in laboratories. Some of the practices given below to determine the Planck constant are now used to determine the mass of the kilogram. All of the methods given below except the X-ray crystal density method rely on the theoretical basis of the Josephson effect and the quantum Hall effect.

Josephson constant 

The Josephson constant KJ relates the potential difference U generated by the Josephson effect at a "Josephson junction" with the frequency ν of the microwave radiation. The theoretical treatment of Josephson effect suggests very strongly that .

The Josephson constant may be measured by comparing the potential difference generated by an array of Josephson junctions with a potential difference which is known in SI volts. The measurement of the potential difference in SI units is done by allowing an electrostatic force to cancel out a measurable gravitational force, in a Kibble balance. Assuming the validity of the theoretical treatment of the Josephson effect, KJ is related to the Planck constant by

Kibble balance 

A Kibble balance (formerly known as a watt balance) is an instrument for comparing two powers, one of which is measured in SI watts and the other of which is measured in conventional electrical units. From the definition of the conventional watt W90, this gives a measure of the product KJ2RK in SI units, where RK is the von Klitzing constant which appears in the quantum Hall effect. If the theoretical treatments of the Josephson effect and the quantum Hall effect are valid, and in particular assuming that , the measurement of KJ2RK is a direct determination of the Planck constant.

Magnetic resonance 

The gyromagnetic ratio γ of an object is the ratio of its magnetic moment to its angular momentum, which is directly related to the constant of proportionality between the frequency ν of nuclear magnetic resonance (or electron paramagnetic resonance for electrons) and the applied magnetic field B: . The protons are said to be "shielded" from the applied magnetic field by the electrons in the water molecule, the same effect that gives rise to chemical shift in NMR spectroscopy, and this is indicated by a prime on the symbol for the gyromagnetic ratio, γ′p. The gyromagnetic ratio is related to the shielded proton magnetic moment μ′p, the spin number I ( for protons) and the reduced Planck constant.

The ratio of the shielded proton magnetic moment μ′p to the electron magnetic moment μe can be measured separately and to high precision, as the imprecisely known value of the applied magnetic field cancels itself out in taking the ratio. The value of μe in Bohr magnetons is also known: it is half the electron g-factor ge. Hence

A further complication is that the measurement of γ′p involves the measurement of an electric current: this is invariably measured in conventional amperes rather than in SI amperes, so a conversion factor is required. The symbol Γ′p-90 is used for the measured gyromagnetic ratio using conventional electrical units. In addition, there are two methods of measuring the value, a "low-field" method and a "high-field" method, and the conversion factors are different in the two cases. Only the high-field value Γ′p-90(hi) is of interest in determining the Planck constant.

Substitution gives the expression for the Planck constant in terms of Γ′p-90(hi):

Faraday constant 

The Faraday constant F is the charge of one mole of electrons, equal to the Avogadro constant NA multiplied by the elementary charge e. It can be determined by careful electrolysis experiments, measuring the amount of silver dissolved from an electrode in a given time and for a given electric current. Substituting the definitions of NA and e gives the relation to the Planck constant.

X-ray crystal density 
The X-ray crystal density method is primarily a method for determining the Avogadro constant NA, but as the Avogadro constant is related to the Planck constant, it also determines a value for h. The principle behind the method is to determine NA as the ratio between the volume of the unit cell of a crystal, measured by X-ray crystallography, and the molar volume of the substance. Crystals of silicon are used, as they are available in high quality and purity by the technology developed for the semiconductor industry. The unit cell volume is calculated from the spacing between two crystal planes referred to as d220. The molar volume Vm(Si) requires a knowledge of the density of the crystal and the atomic weight of the silicon used. The Planck constant is given by

Particle accelerator 
The experimental measurement of the Planck constant in the Large Hadron Collider laboratory was carried out in 2011.

See also 

 CODATA 2018
 International System of Units
 Introduction to quantum mechanics
 List of scientists whose names are used in physical constants
 Planck units
 Wave–particle duality

Notes

References

Citations

Sources

External links 
 "The role of the Planck constant in physics" – presentation at 26th CGPM meeting at Versailles, France, November 2018 when voting took place.

Fundamental constants
1900 in science
Max Planck